was the name of an Irish family of brehons and scholars from Uí Maine, located in present-day County Galway and County Roscommon, in Connacht. It means 'descendant of Cuindlis' (a given name of uncertain meaning). The earliest form of the name can be traced back to an abbot from the 8th century, named Cuindles.

Notable individuals

 Domnall Ó Cuindlis, ( 1342), historian 
 Murchadh Ó Cuindlis ( 1398–1411), a scribe of the Book of Lecan and An Leabhar Breac
 Cornelius Ó Cunlis, (fl. 1444–1469), a bishop of Emly and later of Clonfert

See also
 Candlish – also derived from Cuindlis/Cuindleas; a principally Scottish surname
 McCandless (surname) – also derived from Cuindlis/Cuindleas; fairly numerous in Northern Ireland, also found in Scotland
 McCandlish – also derived from Cuindlis/Cuindleas; a principally Scottish surname

References

Surnames
Irish families
Irish Brehon families
Surnames of Irish origin
Irish-language surnames
Families of Irish ancestry